The  is an agency of the Japanese government established on September 1, 2021, with the aim of strengthening the digitalization of Japan.
The slogan is “Government as a Startup”.

Overview 
Even before the Digital Agency establishment bill was passed, the Cabinet Secretariat's Information Technology (IT) Comprehensive Strategy Office and Social Security and Tax Number System promotion office were active in their respective fields.

The Cabinet of Yoshihide Suga has set up a signboard policy of promoting digitalization by establishing a new Digital Agency and eliminating vertically divided administrative functions.

The Digital Agency is responsible for the IT field for the purpose of promoting IT and DX (digital transformation) of national and local governments. In addition, about 130 out of about 600 employees at the time of inauguration are appointed from the private sector such as IT companies.

Takuya Hirai was appointed as the first Digital Minister, and Yoko Ishikura, an emeritus professor at Hitotsubashi University, was appointed as the first Chief Digital Officer. Karen Makishima was appointed as the Minister in the next cabinet. In April 2022, it was reported that Yoko Ishikura will step down as chief of the Digital Agency due to health issues. Ishikura’s replacement has not yet been selected but the government plans to consider electing someone from the private sector. Ishikura was replaced by Takashi Asanuma.

Outline of the Bill 
 Outline of the Basic Bill on the Formation of a Digital Society,  the Bill on the Establishment of the Digital Agency, and bill on the arrangement of related laws for the formation of a digital society (summary information)

Main mission 
 National government information system
 Eliminate the harmful effects of vertically divided administration, promote the integration and integration of government information systems, and facilitate cooperation with private sector systems
 Digital infrastructure common to all regions
 standardization of information systems of local governments
 Individual Number (the Social Security and Tax Number System)
 Realization of a society where the people can carry out administrative procedures online in a one-stop manner by utilizing the Individual Number
 The Suga Cabinet is committed to having all citizens possess an Individual Number personal identification card by the end of 2022.
 "Semi-public" field
 Promotion of digitalization in fields closely related to daily life such as medical care, education, and disaster prevention
 Data utilization
 Development of a "base registry" that serves as basic data for society
 Achievement of administrative procedures "once only" (the principle that information once sent does not need to be resent)

Criticism

Entertainment coverage by NTT presidents
 After Takuya Hirai became 1st Digital Minister, it was reported that Hirai was suspected of being entertained by The Nippon Telegraph and Telephone Corporation （NTT） President Jun Sawada twice, on October 2 and December 4, 2020.
 On September 24, 2021, Digital Deputy Director General Koichi Akaishi was disciplined for a one-tenth (one month) reduction in salary for receiving excessive entertainment.

Remote work
 In August 2022, Prime Minister Fumio Kishida caught covid so he worked remotely from the PM's official residence. Kishida took official duties online, but Cabinet ministers, bureaucrats and reporters were still required to assemble in person at the Kantei (prime minister's office). This is because they strictly used intranet for security reasons. Thus online meetings via the internet or actual remote work from home was not possible. Japan was criticized as "a digitally underdeveloped country."

Hanko and fax machines
 In 2021, ministries were urged to end hanko (signature stamp) requirements for 785 types of procedure, 96% of the total, including tax documents. Many politicians opposed discontinuing their regional hand-carved hanko—a "symbol of Japan". The Hanko is still required to sign a plethora of government documents. Hundreds of government offices claimed abolishing fax machines was impossible thus ministers backed down. However, lots of other countries ceased using fax machines years ago.

Disk storage
 On August 31, 2022, Digital Minister Taro Kono tweeted that about 1900 government procedures require the business community to use  disk storage (floppy disc, Compact disc, MiniDisc, etc) to submit applications and other forms. Kono stated that they plan to change those regulations to online.

Banking
 The digitalization of bank services is slow in Japan due to continued widespread use of cash (over 80% of payments are made in cash), and industry inertia. Japanese banks require customers to visit the bank in person to arrange things. Comparatively in other countries its possible to do such things online and via telephone banking. In 2019, the country's government's target was to increase cashless payments to 40 percent by 2025. As of 2020, cashless payments were 18% according to the Japanese government.

Competitiveness
 In 2022, Japan ranks a record low 29th out of 63 countries for global digital competitiveness according to Swiss institute. The country has a shortage of skilled digital workers. Japan ranked 63rd in 4 criteria such as international experience and business agility, but first place in student to teacher ratio.

See also 
Karen Makishima

References

External links 

 Digital Agency 
Global Site of the Digital Agency with information such as the origin of the Digital Agency, the message of the Minister, etc. 

Cabinet Office (Japan)
Government ministries of Japan
Government agencies of Japan
Ministries established in 2021
2021 establishments in Japan